Maurice Gueissaz (24 May 1923 – 11 November 1998) was a Swiss rower. He competed in the men's double sculls event at the 1948 Summer Olympics.

References

External links
  

1923 births
1998 deaths
Swiss male rowers
Olympic rowers of Switzerland
Rowers at the 1948 Summer Olympics